Pareisactus (from the Greek "pareisaktos", meaning "intruder", referring to being represented as a single element among hundreds of hadrosaurid bones) is a genus of rhabdodontid ornithopod dinosaur from the Late Cretaceous Conquès Member of the Tremp Formation in the Southern Pyrenees of Spain. The type and only species is P. evrostos, known only from a single scapula.

References 

Iguanodonts
Late Cretaceous dinosaurs of Europe
Maastrichtian life
Cretaceous Spain
Fossils of Spain
Tremp Formation
Fossil taxa described in 2019
Ornithischian genera